Fulvio Pennacchi (December 27, 1905 in Villa Collemandina – October 5, 1992 in São Paulo) was an  Italian-Brazilian artist who specialized in painted murals and made ceramics.

He was part of the Santa Helena Group, together with Alfredo Volpi, Francisco Rebolo,  Aldo Bonadei, Alfredo Rizzotti, Mario Zanini, Humberto Rosa and others.

His painting is sensitive and personal, particularly in the interpretation of major biblical themes and the lives of saints, owing to his childhood marked by a Catholic religious education. He was remarkable also for his interpretation of the caipira world.

See also
 Alfredo Volpi
 List of Brazilian painters

External links
  Na praia, or "On the beach"
  Aldeia soltando balões, or "Hamlet blowing up balloons"
  Marinha com pescadores, or "Seascape with fishermen"
  Pennacchi 100 anos, Pinacoteca do Estado, "Pennacchi Centennial Birthday, at S. Paulo State Pinacotheca"

1905 births
1992 deaths
Modern artists
Italian emigrants to Brazil
20th-century Brazilian painters
20th-century Brazilian male artists